, better known by his pen name , is a Japanese manga artist. Shirow is best known for the manga Ghost in the Shell, which has since been turned into three theatrical anime films, two anime television series, an anime television movie, an anime ONA series, a theatrical live action movie, and several video games.

Life and career
Born in the Hyōgo Prefecture capital city of Kobe, he studied oil painting at Osaka University of Arts. While in college, he developed an interest in manga, which led him to create his own complete work, Black Magic, which was published in the manga dōjinshi Atlas. His work caught the eye of Seishinsha President Harumichi Aoki, who offered to publish him.

The result was best-selling manga Appleseed, a full volume of densely plotted drama taking place in an ambiguous future. The story was a sensation, and won the 1986 Seiun Award for Best Manga. After a professional reprint of Black Magic and a second volume of Appleseed, he released Dominion in 1986. Two more volumes of Appleseed followed before he began work on Ghost in the Shell.

In 2007, he collaborated again with Production I.G to co-create the original concept for the anime television series Ghost Hound, Production I.G's 20th anniversary project. A further original collaboration with Production I.G began airing in April 2008, titled Real Drive.

Bibliography

Manga
 series:
  (1985–1986)
 "Dominion: Phantom of the Audience" (1988), short story
  (1995)

 series:
  (1989–1990)
  (1991–1996)
  (2019), with Junichi Fujisaku
  (1997)

Stand-alones:
  (1983)
  (1985–1989)
  (1986)
  (1987)
  (1990–1991)
 Exon Depot (1992)
  (1992–1994)
  (2007–2008)
  (2008)

Art books
A substantial amount of Shirow's work has been released in art book or poster book format. The following is an incomplete list.

 Intron Depot 1 (1992) (science fiction–themed color illustration art book collecting his work from 1981 to 1991)
 Intron Depot 2: Blades (1998) (fantasy-themed color illustration art book featuring female characters with armor and edged weapons)
 Cybergirls Portfolio (2000)
 Intron Depot 3: Ballistics (2003) (military-themed color illustration and CG art book featuring female characters with guns)
 Intron Depot 4: Bullets (2004) (color illustration art book collecting his work between 1995 and 1999)
 Intron Depot 5: Battalion (2012) (game & animation artwork covering the period 2001–2009)
 Intron Depot 6: Barb Wire 01 (2013) (illustrations for novels 2007–2010)
 Intron Depot 7: Barb Wire 02 (2013) (illustrations for novels 2007–2010)
 Intron Depot 8: Bomb Bay (2018) (illustrations 1992-2009)
 Intron Depot 9: Barrage Fire (2019) (illustrations 1998-2017)
 Intron Depot 10: Bloodbard (2020) (illustrations 2004-2019)
 Intron Depot 11: Bailey Bridge (2020) (illustrations 2012-2014)
 Kokin Toguihime Zowshi Shu (2009)
 Pieces 1 (2009)
 Pieces 2: Phantom Cats (2010)
 Pieces 3: Wild Wet Quest (2010)
 Pieces 4: Hell Hound 01 (2010)
 Pieces 5: Hell Hound 02 (2011)
 Pieces 6: Hell Cat (2011)
 Pieces 7: Hell Hound 01 & 02 Miscellaneous Work + α (2011)
 Pieces 8: Wild Wet West (2012)
 Pieces 9: Kokon Otogizoshi Shu Hiden (2012)
 Pieces GEM 01: The Ghost in The Shell Data + α (2014)
 Pieces GEM 02: Neuro Hard Bee Planet (2015)
 Pieces GEM 03: Appleseed Drawings (2016)
 W-Tails Cat 1 (2012)
 W-Tails Cat 2 (2013)
 W-Tails Cat 3 (2016)
 Greaseberries 1 (2014)
 Greaseberries 2 (2014)
 Greaseberries 3 (2018)
 Greaseberries 4 (2019)
 Greaseberries Rough (2019)

Galgrease
Galgrease (published in Uppers Magazine, 2002) is the collected name of several erotic manga and poster books by Shirow. The name comes from the fact that the women depicted often look "greased".

The first series of Galgrease booklets included four issues each in the following settings:

 Wild Wet West (Wild West-themed)
 Hellhound (Horror-themed)
 Galhound (Near-future science fiction–themed)

The second series included another run of 12 booklets in the following worlds:

 Wild Wet Quest (A Tomb Raider or Indiana Jones–style sequel to Wild Wet West)
 Hellcat (Pirate-themed)
 Galhound 2 (Near-future science fiction–themed)

After each regular series, there were one or more bonus poster books that revisited the existing characters and settings.

Minor works
 "Areopagus Arther" (1980), published in ATLAS (dōjinshi)
 "Yellow Hawk" (1981), published in ATLAS (dōjinshi)
 "Colosseum Pick" (1982), published in Funya (dōjinshi)
 "Pursuit (Manga)" (1982), published in Kintalion (dōjinshi)
 "Opional Orientation" (1984), published in ATLAS (dōjinshi)
 "Battle on Mechanism" (1984), published in ATLAS (dōjinshi)
 "Metamorphosis in Amazoness" (1984), published in ATLAS (dōjinshi)
 "Arice in Jargon" (1984), published in ATLAS (dōjinshi)
 "Bike Nut" (1985), published in Dorothy (dōjinshi)
 "Gun Dancing" (1986), published in Young Magazine Kaizokuban
 "Colosseum Pick" (1990), published in Comic Fusion Atpas (dōjinshi)

Other
 Design of the MAPP1-SM mouse series (2002, commissioned by Elecom)
 Pandora in the Crimson Shell: Ghost Urn (2012), original concept
 Design of the EHP-SH1000 and EHP-SL100 headphones (2016, commissioned by Elecom)

Adaptations

Anime

Film
 Ghost in the Shell (1995) by Mamoru Oshii
 Ghost in the Shell 2: Innocence (2004) by Mamoru Oshii
 Appleseed (2004) by Shinji Aramaki
 Ghost in the Shell: Stand Alone Complex - Solid State Society (2006) by Kenji Kamiyama
 Appleseed Ex Machina (2007) by Shinji Aramaki and John Woo
 Appleseed Alpha (2014) by Shinji Aramaki and Joseph Chou
 Kōkaku no Pandora - Ghost Urn (2015) by Munenori Nawa
 Ghost in the Shell: The New Movie (2016) by Kazuya Nomura

OVAs and ONAs
 Black Magic M-66 (1987) by Hiroyuki Kitakubo and Shirow Masamune (this is the only anime in which Shirow played a direct role in the production)
 Appleseed (1988) by Kazuyoshi Katayama
 Dominion (1988) by Takaaki Ishiyama and Kôichi Mashimo
 New Dominion Tank Police (1990) by Noboru Furuse and Junichi Sakai
 Landlock (1995) by Yasuhiro Matsumura (character and mecha designs only)
 Gundress (1999) by Junichi Sakai (character and mecha designs only)
 Tank Police Team: Tank S.W.A.T. 01 (2006) by Romanov Higa
 W Tails Cat: A Strange Presence (2013)
 Ghost in the Shell: Arise (2013) by Kazuchika Kise
 Ghost in the Shell: SAC_2045 (2020) by Shinji Aramaki and Kenji Kamiyama

Television
 Ghost in the Shell: Stand Alone Complex (2003) by Kenji Kamiyama (also called Alone on Earth or GitS:SAC)
 Ghost in the Shell: S.A.C. 2nd GIG (2004) by Kenji Kamiyama (second season of GitS:SAC)
 Ghost Hound (2007) by Ryūtarō Nakamura; original concept in collaboration with Production I.G
 Real Drive (2008) by Kazuhiro Furuhashi; original concept in collaboration with Production I.G
 Appleseed XIII (2011) by Takayuki Hamana
 Ghost in the Shell: Arise  - Alternative Architecture (2015) by Kazuchika Kise
 Pandora in the Crimson Shell: Ghost Urn (2016) by Munenori Nawa, original concept for the source manga

Live action
 Ghost in the Shell (2017) by Rupert Sanders

Video games

PC Engine
 Toshi Tensou Keikaku: Eternal City (action platformer)

Super Famicom
 Appleseed: Oracle of Prometheus

Nintendo DS
 Fire Emblem: Shadow Dragon (strategy RPG)

PlayStation
 Ghost in the Shell
 Yarudora Series Vol. 3: Sampaguita
 Project Horned Owl
 GunDress

PlayStation 2
 Ghost in the Shell: Stand Alone Complex
Appleseed EX

PlayStation Portable
 Ghost in the Shell: Stand Alone Complex
 Yarudora Series Vol. 3: Sampaguita

Microsoft Windows
 Ghost in the Shell: Stand Alone Complex - First Assault Online

References

Further reading

External links

 
 
 
 Masamune Shirow at Media Arts Database 
 Masamune Shirow at Baka-Updates Manga

 
1961 births
20th-century Japanese male writers
20th-century pseudonymous writers
21st-century Japanese male writers
21st-century pseudonymous writers
Art writers
Cyberpunk writers
Hentai creators
Japanese animators
Japanese erotic artists
Japanese erotica writers
Japanese science fiction writers
Japanese speculative fiction writers
Living people
Manga artists from Hyōgo Prefecture
Osaka University of Arts alumni
People from Kobe
Pseudonymous artists